The 2000 Uzbek League season was the 9th edition of top level football in Uzbekistan since independence from the Soviet Union in 1992.

Overview
It was contested by 20 teams, and Do'stlik won the championship. Top scorer was Jafar Irismetov of Do'stlik with 45 goals, the most scored by one player in a single season.

League standings

Top scorer
 Jafar Irismetov, Do'stlik - 45 goals.

References
Uzbekistan - List of final tables (RSSSF)

Uzbekistan Super League seasons
1
Uzbek
Uzbek